Prince and Great Steward of Scotland are two of the titles of the heir apparent to the throne of the United Kingdom. The current holder of these titles is Prince William, who bears the other Scottish titles of Duke of Rothesay, Earl of Carrick, Lord of the Isles and Baron of Renfrew.

Prince of Scotland
The title "Prince of Scotland" originated in a time when Scotland was a separate kingdom prior to entering a political union with England in 1707. The title was held by the heir apparent to the Scottish throne, in addition to his being Duke of Rothesay, Earl of Carrick, Baron of Renfrew, Lord of the Isles, and Great Steward of Scotland. Before the English and Scottish crowns were united under James VI and I, sources indicate it was intended to be used in much the same way the title "Prince of Wales" was used to designate the heir apparent to the English throne, although the Scottish heir-apparent was addressed only as Duke of Rothesay until that time.

Principality of Scotland
The title originated from a charter granting the Principality of Scotland to the future James I of Scotland, the then heir apparent, on 10 December 1404, by Robert III. During the reign of James III, permanency was enacted to the title. The designation "Principality of Scotland" implied (and implies) not Scotland as a whole but lands in south-western Scotland, in areas such as Renfrewshire, Ayrshire and Kirkcudbrightshire, appropriated as patrimony of the sovereign's eldest son for his maintenance.

In modern times, the prince remains paramount superior in these lands (whilst the Crown serves this role in the rest of Scotland). The Abolition of Feudal Tenure etc. (Scotland) Act 2000, however, abolished most remaining feudal duties and privileges attaching to the principality, leaving the prince's status as mainly titular. Prior to the 2000 Act, the principality was entirely feued out to tenants and brought in a small income. All title deeds in Ayrshire and Renfrewshire are required to be sealed with the prince's seal. Revenue gained from feudal dealings were counted as income for the Duchy of Cornwall, a more substantial estate also held by the monarch's eldest son who is heir apparent.

Great Steward
The Great Stewardship of Scotland was granted to Walter Fitz Alan by David I, and came to the sovereign in 1371, through the accession to the Scottish throne of Robert II, son of Robert the Bruce's daughter, Marjorie, and Walter Stewart, 6th Great Steward of Scotland. Since that date, it has been enjoyed by the sovereign's eldest son.

The titles "Prince of Scotland" and "Great Steward of Scotland" are normally conjoined in legislation.

Use of titles
Since James VI also became the King of England and Ireland in 1603, the titles have fallen from habitual use, the holder from then on usually also being Duke of Cornwall, Prince of Wales and Duke of Rothesay, which were preferred, and is now seldom referred to, except as the last in the conventional list of the Prince of Wales's titles.

Similar to the process of Crown consent, Parliament shall not debate whether a bill affecting (directly or by implication) the personal property or interests of the Prince and Great Steward of Scotland be passed or approved unless such consent to those provisions has been signified at a meeting of the Parliament. In the Scottish Parliament, such consent is signified by a member of the Scottish Government.

When the sovereign had no son, there has been uncertainty as to who should bear and use the titles and enjoy the revenues of the principality. Both Mary, Queen of Scots, and George II of Great Britain used the titles and styles, but on the accession of George VI there was a difference between the opinion of the Lord Lyon and the advice given by the Scottish Lords of Appeal to the Garter King of Arms. The matter remains unresolved, but is unlikely to be of practical significance for some time.

References

Titles in Scotland
Heirs apparent